Minuscule: Valley of the Lost Ants is a 2013 French-Belgian live action CGI animated film based on the television series Minuscule. The film was written and directed by series creators Hélène Giraud and Thomas Szabo. This film is a sound film with a synchronized soundtrack featuring music and sound effects and with little to no spoken dialogue. It won the César Award for Best Animated Feature Film at the 40th César Awards. A sequel, Minuscule 2: Mandibles from Far Away, was released on January 30, 2019.

Plot
In the valleys of France, a family of ladybugs give birth to their first litter & raise them throughout the years until they're ready to reach independence. A bold male named Cox is constantly bullied by a group of flies led by the childish Toofette, and during one time where he gets separated while being annoyed, attempts to fly away back to his family, but when they chase after him, he crashes into a rock and into a crevice, knocking him out and breaking off a wing. Unable to fly and locate his family, Cox shelters in a tin for the night. The tin is full of sugar cubes, part of an abandoned picnic, having its owners abandon it due to them rushing to the city for their new baby to arrive. The following morning, various bugs have raided the picnic's bounty and are busy carrying off the spoils when Cox gets up to join them in their heist. A foraging patrol of black ants, find the picnic, abandon their original load, and start carrying off the tin, with Cox still inside, whom they find and allow him to join them after he fends them off from a hungry lizard while crossing a stone wall, on their journey to their busy anthill fortress on the top of a cliff.

During their trek, the ants encounter a patrol of red ants led by the fearful dictator Butor, who try to stop them so they can get their food, so the black ants try to give them one of the sugar cubes as a peace offering, but they pursue them anyway for the rest of the sugar, due to them not satisfied with what they got. The black ants escape by sliding down an embankment and into a river, on board the top of the tin, sending them on a wild ride. The red ants track them down stream in a soda can. At the rapids, Cox falls overboard and the ants rescue him from a hungry pike named Boboche. They all go over a waterfall and the tin washes up on the shore, while the soda can and Boboche sink down onto the river bottom. The red ants escape the soda can & manage to get back to the surface while Boboche get stuck in the sand & suffocates to death. The black ants abandon the tin, pick up the sugar cubes and start hauling them back to their nest. After hauling themselves onto land and find the tin empty, Butor & his patrol continue to follow them until they break up while following the black ants onto a road, due to them afraid they'll get run over & killed while crossing, leaving Butor all by himself to follow them to their anthill, and return back to his colony's anthill fort & report to his queen for reinforcements to get the sugar, while his patrol run back home all together & rejoin Butor's armies upon arrival.

On their journey, Cox becomes friends with the patrol's leader, Mandible. He meets another family of ladybugs that Cox tries to join for a replacement family, with one female Cox falls in love with, but unable to fly with them on one wing, makes the decision to remain with the ants as his new family. After the long and arduous journey, they arrive at the busting, bug-filled, big city citadel where Mandible invites him to join the colony, and they present their hoard of sugar cubes to their egg-laden queen in her throne room & put it in the food storage. At midnight, Cox dreams of flying with both families and his girlfriend, wakes up and tests its wings outside the nest. His wing and strength is regrowing slowly and steady, but he still can't fly. The next morning, Butor, his patrol, the queen and the entire red ant colony arrive and besiege the black ant's nest by bombarding and destroying it using slingshots, using bug spray to flush the black ants out of the nest & ward them away from their army, trying to ram the front door with a pinecone, & battling the black ant's armies, sometimes killing both kinds of ants in the process. The black ants keep sending their forces to take them down, & use their own weapons, including dropping objects on them to knock them out and kill them, creating a moat of aspirin foam to kill & block the red ants from trying to climb the walls, & setting off fireworks which incinerates and kills some red ants when exploded, but they don't have any more matches to light the rest. Cox remembers that there was a box of matches at the abandoned picnic, and now able to fly, even though the ants make a paper plane out of a dollar for him, escapes the red ant siege, and sets off into the forest to retrieve them.

At the now empty picnic area, Cox finds the matchbox but before he can fly back with it, a tiny black male spider runs off with the matchbox to craft around with the matches, and takes it to its dollhouse home in a sewage pipe that Cox came across with his family. Cox follows behind him undetected and sneaks into the house. A frog named Jean-Paul tries to eat them for dinner by grabbing them with his tongue through an open window, but the duo fight back and the house topples onto Jean-Paul, seemingly crushing and killing him off-screen and knocking Cox out in the process. After a night's rest, and grapes for breakfast, Cox's strength is regained. After he makes a bond with the spider, Cox persuades him to let him have the matches and sets out with them back to the nest. Cox stops on the way to save his lover, who has reached independence & has left her family, from Toofette's gang, which are all killed and knocked out after an open chase ends up with an automobile hitting them, with the ladybugs getting the last laugh. They have a private wedding and honeymoon in the valley before Cox temporarily leaves her to resume his mission. 

He returns to the besieged fortress which has now been half demolished. With their new matches, the black ants unleash their remaining weapons & armies, incinerating and wiping out some of the red ants and starting a wildfire that covers the forest & drives the entire red ant colony away to their anthill in defeat, with Butor swearing revenge on the heroes. A fire and rescue plane patrol arrives and extinguishes the wildfire, saving Cox and the entire black ant colony from being overcooked, but flattening the nest into a mound of mud in the process. They all emerge from the basement and begin rebuilding, while Cox leaves back to the meadow to raise his new family with his lover. A few years later, they return to the newly rebuilt ant nest and Cox sits with his old friend & they watch the sunset, as their next adventures are just beginning. In a mid-credits scene, the ant that was storing the objects that were used to defeat the red ants, manages to complete a number shuffle puzzle that he was trying to solve ago, & figures out which number is missing.

Home media
Minuscule was released on both DVD and Blu-ray in France on 26 August 2014. It was later released in a Blu-ray collection together with its sequel, Minuscule - Mandibles from Far Away, on 5 November 2019.

Accolades
Nominated: 2013 Tallinn Black Nights Film Festival (Best Children's Film)
Nominated: 27th European Film Awards (Best Animated Feature Film)
Nominated: San Sebastian International Film Festival (Best Animated Feature Film)
Official preselection: Academy Awards and BAFTA
Won: Mill Valley Film Festival (San Francisco) (Children’s FilmFest Gold Award)
Won: Chicago International Children’s Film Festival (Honorary Prize)
Won: China International Cartoon and Animation Festival (Silver cup prize for the animated film)
Won: 5th Magritte Awards (Magritte Award for Best Foreign Film in Coproduction)
Won: 40th Cesar Awards (César Award for Best Animated Feature Film)

References

External links

2013 films
2010s French animated films
2013 computer-animated films
Animated films about insects
Belgian animated films
César Award winners
Films with live action and animation
Films without speech
Magritte Award winners
Animated films without speech